Thomas L. Fisher is a visual effects artist who is most known for being part of the team to the film Titanic.

He has worked on over 35 films since 1974.

Oscars
Both of these are in the category of Best Visual Effects
 67th Academy Awards-Nominated for True Lies. Nomination shared with John Bruno, Patrick McClung and Jacques Stroweis. Lost to Forrest Gump.
 70th Academy Awards-Titanic. Shared with Michael Kanfer, Mark Lasoff and Robert Legato. Won.

References

External links
 

Living people
Best Visual Effects Academy Award winners
Special effects people
1941 births